Khanabad (also Romanized as Khānābād; also known as Khānābād-e Bāshī) is a village in Shurab Rural District, in the Central District of Arsanjan County, Fars Province, Iran. At the 2006 census, its population was 364, in 71 families.

References 

Populated places in Arsanjan County